Satakentia liukiuensis (satake palm, yaeyama-yashi [Japanese ヤエヤマヤシ], satakentia palm, yaeyama palm), is a species of palm tree. They are endemic to Ishigaki Island and Iriomote Island in the Yaeyama Islands, the south-westernmost of the Ryukyu Islands, Japan. It is the only species in the genus Satakentia.

The genus and the species were both circumscribed by Harold 'Hal' Emery Moore in Principes vol.13 on page 5 in 1969.

The genus name of Satakentia is in honour of Toshihiko Satake (1910–1998), who was a Japanese factory owner (the 2nd President of Satake Corporation), producer of rice-processing equipment and also an expert in Arecaceae.

References

Carpoxylinae
Flora of the Ryukyu Islands
Data deficient plants
Monotypic Arecaceae genera
Taxonomy articles created by Polbot